Green Monday (GM) is a startup that makes low-carbon and sustainable living simple. Founded in 2012 in Hong Kong, GM is aimed at tackling climate change and ensuring food security.

As of 2014, results of a survey by market research company Ipsos showed that 1.6 million Hong Kong people, or 23% of the city's total population, embrace "Green Monday" - an increase of 18% from 2012, and over 1,000 restaurants in Hong Kong are offering their menus.

History
Green Monday started to grow beyond Hong Kong in 2014. Events that marked their international recognition and growth include:  
 Columbia University became the first university in the US to launch Green Monday on their campus.
 Fast Company (magazine) named Green Monday among China's Top 50 Most Innovative Companies of Year 2014.
 The US Consulate of Hong Kong, the American Humane Society and the Italian Chamber of Commerce in Hong Kong became Green Monday's partners.
 Green Monday was launched at the Washington University in St. Louis in January 2015, becoming the second university in the US to join the program
 Green Monday's School Program has been sponsored by a local bank charitable foundation. As of 2014, more than 800 schools with about 600,000 students from kindergarten to university in Hong Kong pledged to observe "Green Monday".

External links 
 
Green Monday Facebook

References

Climate change mitigation
Vegetarian organizations
Social enterprises